Ballinphort is a townland in County Westmeath, Ireland.

Ballinphort is one of 14 townlands of the civil parish of Multyfarnham in the barony of Corkaree in the Province of Leinster.

The neighbouring townlands are: Ballynakill to the north–west, Ballinriddera to the south–east, Lismalady to the south–west and Tober to the west.

In the 1911 census of Ireland there were 3 houses and 19 inhabitants in the townland.

References

External links
Map of Ballinphort at openstreetmap.org
Ballinphort at the IreAtlas Townland Data Base
Ballinphort at Townlands.ie
Ballinphort at The Placenames Database of Ireland

Townlands of County Westmeath